Batheulima abbreviata is a species of sea snail, a marine gastropod mollusc in the genus Batheulima, a minor genus within the family Eulimidae.

Distribution
This marine species is found within European waters (ERMS scope), mainly the Mediterranean Sea.

References

External links
 To World Register of Marine Species

Eulimidae